Transmembrane protein 47 is a protein that in humans is encoded by the TMEM47 gene.

Function 

This gene encodes a member of the PMP22/EMP/claudin protein family. The encoded protein is localized to the ER and the plasma membrane. In dogs, transcripts of this gene exist at high levels in the brain.

References

Further reading